Anatoly Kolesov (born 1931) is a Soviet cyclist. He competed in the individual and team road race events at the 1952 Summer Olympics.

References

External links
 

1931 births
Possibly living people
Soviet male cyclists
Olympic cyclists of the Soviet Union
Cyclists at the 1952 Summer Olympics